Ruffian is a 2007 American television film that tells the story of the U.S. Racing Hall of Fame Champion Thoroughbred filly Ruffian who went undefeated until her death after breaking down in a nationally televised match race at Belmont Park on July 6, 1975 against the Kentucky Derby winner, Foolish Pleasure.

Made by ESPN Original Entertainment, the film is directed by Yves Simoneau and stars Sam Shepard as Ruffian's trainer, Frank Whiteley. The producers used four different geldings in the role of Ruffian. Locations for the 2007 film included Louisiana Downs in Shreveport, Louisiana and Belmont Park in Elmont, New York.

Ruffian was first broadcast on June 9, 2007 on the ABC television network. The DVD was released on June 12, 2007.

Previously, ESPN Classic had broadcast a special on July 6, 2000 to mark the twenty-fifth anniversary of the death of Ruffian.

This movie is also one of Laura Bailey's only major live action roles.

Cast
Sam Shepard as  Frank Whiteley
Frank Whaley as  Bill Nack
Laura Bailey as  Cassie
Nicholas Pryor as  Stuart Janney
Christine Belford as  Barbara Janney
Mathew Greer as  Dan Williams
Louis Herthum as  Dr. Harthill
John McConnell as  Tony Pappas
Michael Harding as  LeRoy Jolley
Stuart Greer as  Dan Lasater
Jon Stafford as  Dr. Pendergrast
David Dwyer as  Dick Sandler
Bill Flynn as  Elder Reporter
Keith Flippen as  Dinny Phipps
Jerry Leggio as  Lucien Laurin
Vladimir Diaz as  Jacinto Vásquez
Joel Santiago as Vincent Bracciale
Francisco Torres as Braulio Baeza
Dave Johnson as himself (track announcer)
 Gary McKillips as Jack

References

External links
 
 ESPN film trailer at the NTRA
 Background on Ruffian and the film at ESPN

American television films
Films about horses
American horse racing films
Sports films based on actual events
Phipps family
2007 television films
2007 films
Films shot in Louisiana
Films directed by Yves Simoneau
ESPN Films films
2007 drama films
2000s English-language films
2000s American films